Jérôme Gendre (died 4 October 2020) was a French rugby union player and coach. He played amongst others for RC Narbonne, Castres Olympique, ASM Clermont Auvergne and FC Auch Gers. He died aged 43 after having suffered a heart attack.

References

2020 deaths
French rugby union players
Year of birth missing
Place of death missing